"Silent" is the first single from Gerald Walker's I Remember When This All Meant Something....

Background
Gerald said he chose "Silent" to be his first single because "the song's subject matter is one which is rarely  touched on in hip-hop." 

Rey Hussein of It's Not That Serious writes "Silent is one of the most personal, sentimental and lyrical pieces of work Walker has to date. Featuring creepy, fantasy elements on the beat, followed by some heavy synths and soft drums. Walker's sing-song flow about keeping an encounter on the hush, is not only classy but praise-worthy as well."

Music video
Directed by Da Visionaryz, the music video was shot in the third week of November, 2010. It was shot in Chicago, Illinois, Gerald Walker's hometown and is expected to be released in December  2010

References

2010 debut singles
Gerald Walker songs
2010 songs